Betsy Harris (born April 2, 1972) is an American basketball coach and former professional player.

Early life
Harris was born in Jacksonville, Florida. She went to Decatur High School, in Decatur, Mississippi, where she won the state championship in 1990.

College career
Harris played college basketball for the University of Alabama from 1990 to 1994. She led Alabama to three straight NCAA Tournament appearances and a trip the NCAA Division I Final Four in 1994. She earned Second-Team All-SEC honors as a senior in 1994 and was also named the MVP of the Midwest Regional and earned a spot on the 1994 Final Four All-Tournament Team.

Alabama statistics 
Source

Professional career
After graduating in 1994, Harris went on to play four years professionally in Greece (Apollon), Iceland (Breiðablik), Spain (CD Universidad de Oviedo), Sweden (Ockelbo BBK), and Switzerland (ABB Baden).

After starting the year playing in Spain, Harris signed with reigning Icelandic champions Breiðablik in August 1995. She helped Breiðablik win the Icelandic Super Cup and reach the playoffs. After the season, where she averaged 26.6 points per game, she was named the Foreign Player of the Year.

In 1998, she was invited to training camp with the WNBA's Detroit Shock.

Coaching career
In 2014, Harris was hired as the head coach of Florida Southern women's basketball team. In 2019, she won her second-consecutive Sunshine State Conference championship. During her stint with Florida, she was a three-time Sunshine State Conference Coach of the Year and the WBCA South Region Coach of the Year in 2019. She stepped down from her post in August 2022 and took over as head coach at East Central Community College in Decatur, Mississippi.

References

External links
Profile at Florida Southern
Profile at East Central

1972 births
Living people
Alabama Crimson Tide women's basketball players
American expatriate basketball people in Iceland
American women's basketball players
Betsy Harris
Betsy Harris
Guards (basketball)
American women's basketball coaches